A mine roller or mine trawl is a demining device mounted on a tank or armoured personnel carrier, designed to detonate anti-tank mines. It allows engineers to clear a lane through a minefield which is protected by enemy fire.

The device is usually composed of a fork or two push arm assemblies fitted to the front of a tank hull, with two banks of rollers that can be lowered in front of the tank's tracks. Each roller bank has several heavy wheels studded with short projecting steel girders, which apply a higher ground pressure than the tank's tracks. This ensures the explosion of pressure-fused anti-tank mines, which would otherwise explode under the track itself.

History 

At the end of the First World War, the British Army Engineers Major Giffard LeQuesne Martel and Major Charles Inglis experimented with tank bridges and mine rollers based on the Mark V tank. Three special tank battalions were mustered for trials at Christchurch in Hampshire, England, in 1918. Because of the Armistice, these were never tested in battle, but some development work continued with the Experimental Bridging Company until 1925.

After great difficulties caused by minefields in the Winter War against Finland, the Soviet Red Army assigned P.M. Mugalev at the Dormashina Factory in Nikolayev to design a mine-clearing vehicle. Prototypes were tested based on the T-28 medium tank in 1940. Development was interrupted by the start of World War II, but resumed in 1942. T-60 and KV tank chassis underwent trials, but only the T-34 was deemed to have a sufficiently robust transmission and clutch.

Experimental detachments of PT-34 mine roller tanks were formed in May 1942, and saw action at Voronezh in August. The first Independent Engineer Tank Regiment with eighteen mine rollers was fielded in October 1943. At least five regiments were formed during the war.

The PT-34's huge roller fork was semi-permanently mounted on a T-34 or T-34-85 tank. The rollers were usually removed for travel, and only installed for mine clearing operations. Adaptations for later tanks consisted of two lighter arms. The Mugalev system was adopted by U.S. and Israeli forces in the 1980s.

During WWII, the Germans created the experimental Raumer S 4-wheeled armoured mine clearance vehicle, built by Krupp. Weighing 130 tons, the prototype was captured by the Americans at the end of the war.

The British developed the Anti Mine Roller Attachment (AMRA) for their Matilda II, Valentine, and Crusader tanks in the desert. The rollers only covered the width of each track rather than clearing a tank-width path for subsequent vehicles and troops. To these were added a Churchill tank with the evocatively named "Canadian Indestructible Roller Device" (CIRD). The British used mine rollers to detect the presence of minefields and then used mine flails for the clearance.

During World War II, the mine roller most used by US forces was the T1E3 Mine Exploder unit, attached to the M4 Sherman medium tank. It was nicknamed Aunt Jemima because of its pancake-like appearance. It had two sets of five disc rollers,  in diameter each.

See also 

 Demining
 Mine plow
 Mine flail
 Combat engineering vehicle

References

External links 
 GlobalSecurity.org's page on Mine Clearing Roller System (MCRS)
 Photo of an APC with mine roller

Armoured fighting vehicle equipment
Mine warfare countermeasures